Eupithecia kuroshio is a moth in the family Geometridae. It is found in Japan and Taiwan.

References

Moths described in 1980
kuroshio
Moths of Asia